The following is a list of major conflicts fought by Ukraine, by Ukrainian people or by regular armies during periods when independent states existed on the modern territory of Ukraine, from the Kyivan Rus' times to the present day. It also includes wars fought outside Ukraine by Ukrainian military. 

The Kyivan Rus' is considered as the first national Ukrainian state (together with Belarus and Russia), the Kingdom of Galicia–Volhynia (Ruthenia) as its political successor, and after the period of domination by the Polish–Lithuanian Commonwealth the Cossack states (the Cossack Hetmanate and the Zaporozhian Sich). The Ukrainian Cossacks were also related to the Ottoman Empire and the Crimean Khanate, having many conflicts with them. By the late 18th century, Ukraine didn't have independent states anymore, because it was ruled by the more powerful states of the time, namely the Ottoman Empire, the Russian Empire and the Austrian Empire. There were several internal armed conflicts between various Ukrainian ideological factions (sometimes with foreign support) in the first half of the 20th century (especially during the 1917–1921 Ukrainian War of Independence and the 1939–1945 Second World War), but modern Ukrainian militaries (since 1917) have been mostly fighting with armies of neighbouring states, such as the Russian Provisional Government (Kiev Bolshevik Uprising November 1917), the Russian SFSR (Ukrainian War of Independence 1917–1921), the Second Polish Republic (Polish–Ukrainian War 1918–1919), Nazi Germany and the Soviet Union (Second World War and post-War resistance), and since 2014, the Russian Federation (Russo-Ukrainian War).

   





Kyivan Rus' and the Kingdom of Ruthenia (800s–1349) 

This section contains list of wars involving Kyivan Rus' and its principalities (Principality of Kyiv, Principality of Chernihiv, Principality of Pereyaslavl, Principality of Volhynia, Principality of Terebovlia, Principality of Halych, Principality of Turov and Pinsk), Kingdom of Galicia–Volhynia (Ruthenia) and Ukrainian duchies under Polish and Lithuanian crowns (like Duchy of Kyiv).

Cossack Ukraine (1649–1764) 
This section contains list of wars involving Zaporozhian Cossacks (including Danubian Sich) and Cossack Hetmanate (both of right-bank and left-bank).

Uprisings

Cossack naval campaigns

Other conflicts

Under Austrian and Russian empires

War of independence (1917–1921) 

This section contains list of wars involving different Ukrainian states de facto existed between 1917 and 1922 (Ukrainian People's Republic, Ukrainian State, Western Ukrainian People's Republic, Hutsul Republic, Komancza Republic) and other Ukrainian anti-bolshevik state formations (Kuban People's Republic, Makhnovshchina, Ukrainian Republic of the Far East).

Interwar period (1922–1938) 

In 1922, the Ukrainian Soviet Socialist Republic was incorporated into the Soviet Union. No armed conflicts on Soviet Ukrainian territory would take place until 1939, although Ukrainian 'national units' would be used as national military formations of the Red Army until 1934, and as such fight in Soviet armed conflicts elsewhere in the world. The western areas of Ukraine (including most of the former West Ukrainian People's Republic's claimed territories) that were annexed by the Second Polish Republic similarly saw no fighting in the interwar period until 1939, although some small and brief armed conflicts did occur elsewhere in Poland in this period.

World War II (1939–1945) 

This section contains only military activity of non-Soviet and non-Nazi Ukrainian organizations.

21st century

Peacekeeping missions

Completed

Current

See also
 List of conflicts in Europe
 
 List of wars between Russia and Ukraine

Notes

References

Sources 
 Крип'якевич І., Гнатевич Б. та ін. Історія українського війська., Львів, 1992., pp. 193–194.
 
 Сокульський А.Л. Флот Запорозької Січі в XVI-XVIII ст.: структурна організація, технологія та військове мистецтво. Дис. к.і.н., К., 1999. pp. 113–114.

Ukraine
Military history of Ukraine
Foreign relations of Ukraine
Wars
Wars